Old Main is a building on the campus of Augsburg University in Minneapolis, Minnesota, in the Cedar-Riverside neighborhood.  It was built in 1901 at a cost of $35,000, designed by the St. Paul firm of Omeyer and Thori and built by Charles F. Haglin, who built other structures such as the Lumber Exchange Building and the Peavey–Haglin Experimental Concrete Grain Elevator.  The building, originally known as "New Main", was listed on the National Register of Historic Places in 1983.

The building is large and symmetrical, evoking a classical architectural style.  When it opened, it contained a chapel, gymnasium, classrooms, library and museum.  It became the center of campus activity and a point of pride for the college.  It has not been altered significantly from its original design.  It retains its architectural integrity, as well as its historical and educational significance.  A number of renovations in 1980 aimed to improve energy efficiency while preserving architectural details from the past.

References

National Register of Historic Places in Minneapolis
School buildings completed in 1901
University and college academic buildings in the United States
University and college buildings on the National Register of Historic Places in Minnesota
Omeyer & Thori buildings
1901 establishments in Minnesota